Betty Jo Nelsen (born October 11, 1935) is a retired American politician and former Minority Leader of the Wisconsin State Assembly.  A Republican, she represented the northeastern suburbs of Milwaukee from 1979 until 1990 in the Assembly.  She left the Assembly to accept an appointment in the administration of President George H. W. Bush as Administrator of the Food and Nutrition Service within the United States Department of Agriculture.

Biography
Nelsen graduated from Dedham High School and the University of Massachusetts Amherst, in 1957.  She is married with three children and resides in Shorewood, Wisconsin.

Career
Nelsen was first elected to the Assembly as a Republican in a special election in July 1979. She was chosen by the Republican caucus as Minority Leader for the 1987-1988 session of the Assembly. Nelsen was re-elected five times, and remained a member of the Assembly until 1990, when she resigned to accept appointment to the U.S. Food and Nutrition Service in Washington, D.C.

President George H. W. Bush appointed her as Administrator of the Food and Nutrition Service within the U.S. Department of Agriculture in January 1990.  She served in that role until the days after Bush's defeat in the 1992 presidential election, when she resigned and returned to the Milwaukee area.  During 1992, President Bush had nominated her to become Assistant Secretary of Agriculture for Food and Consumer Services as well as a member of the board of directors of the Commodity Credit Corporation, but her nomination did not receive a vote by the United States Senate Committee on Agriculture, Nutrition and Forestry, and was returned without action when the Senate adjourned in October 1992.

After returning to Wisconsin, she was appointed by Governor Tommy Thompson to serve on the state Natural Resources Board.

References

|-

|-

|-

|-

Politicians from Boston
Politicians from Dedham, Massachusetts
People from Shorewood, Wisconsin
1935 births
Living people